Quebec West and South was a federal electoral district in Quebec, Canada, that was represented in the House of Commons of Canada from 1935 to 1949.

This riding was created in 1933 from Quebec South and Quebec West ridings.

It was abolished in 1947 when it was merged into Quebec West riding.

Members of Parliament

This riding elected the following Members of Parliament:

Election results

See also 

 List of Canadian federal electoral districts
 Past Canadian electoral districts

External links 
 Riding history from the Library of Parliament

Former federal electoral districts of Quebec